Trachelipus razzautii is a species of woodlouse in the genus Trachelipus belonging to the family Trachelipodidae that can be found in northern Italy, Slovenia, the Greek island of Lesbos and European Turkey.

References

External links

Trachelipodidae
Woodlice of Europe
Crustaceans described in 1913